Miguel Ángel Rojas is a Colombian conceptual artist born in Bogotá in 1946. His work includes drawing, painting, photography,  installations and video and is often related to the sexuality, the marginal culture, the violence and problems involved with drug consumption and production.

Artistic career 
Rojas is a photographer, painter and architect. He finished his studies in painting at the Fine arts school of the National University of Colombia and in architecture at the University Javeriana. His work has been shown individually and collectively since 1972 in Colombia, Venezuela, Australia, Puerto Rico, Cuba, EE.UU., Japan, Brazil, England and Mexico. His work has been awarded first prize in photography of the XXXII Salon of Colombian Artists in 1989; The II International Biennial of San Juan Prize 1979;  León Dobrzinsky Prize 1981; Prize of the XXX Salon of Colombian Artists 1986 in Medellín with special notation of the V American Biennial of graphic arts 1988 in Cali; Prize of the Riogrande national Contest 1989."

Exhibitions 
Individual exhibitions

 2021
 "Regreso a la Maloca", Museo de Arte Moderno de Bogotá, Mambo, Curated by Eugenio Viola. Bogotá. Colombia
 2012
 "Camino Corto" (Short Way), "Museo de Arte de la Universidad Nacional de Colombia" (Art Museum of the National University of Colombia), Bogota, Colombia
 "El nuevo Dorado" (The new Dorado), Project invited to a Solo Project, ARCH: international Fair of Contemporary Art. Madrid, Spain
 2011
 "At the Edge of Scarcity", Sicardi Gallery, Houston, Texas
 2009
 "Pueblito" (Little Town). Museum Bolivariano of Contemporary Art. Santa Marta, Colombia
 2008
 Fotofest 2008, Sicardi Gallery, Houston, Texas
 2007
 "Objetivo-Subjetivo" (Objective-Subjective), Museum of Art of the Bank of the Republic, Bogota, Colombia
 "David", La vitrina, Lugar a Dudas, Cali, Colombia
 2006
 Fotofest 2006, Sicardi Gallery, Houston, Texas
 2002
 "La Cama de Piedra (The Stone Bed), Colombian National Museum, Bogota, Colombia
 2001
 Sub, Valenzuela Gallery – Klenner, Bogota, Colombia
 2000
 "La Cama de Piedra" (The Stone Bed), French Alliance, Bogota, Colombia
 1995
 "Pascal y Pascual" (Pascal and Pascual), Museo Universitario del Chopo, Mexico City, Mexico
 1992
 "Debug y Pintura" (Drawing and Painting), Artery Gallery, Barranquilla, Colombia
 1991
 Bio, Bogotá Museum of Modern Art, Bogota, Colombia
 1990
 "Miguel Angel Rojas", Cartagena Museum of Modern Art, Cartagena, Colombia
 "Miguel Angel Rojas obra en process" (Miguel Angel Rojas work in process), Medellin Museum of Modern Art, Medellín, Colombia
 1985
 Bio, INTAR (International Arts Relations, Inc.), New York, New York
 1982
 "Subjetivo" (Subjective), Gallery Garcés-Velásquez, Bogota, Colombia
 1981
 Works on Paper, Americas Society (former Center of Inter-American Relations), New York, New York 1980 Grain, Bogota Museum of Modern Art, Bogota, Colombia 

Collective exhibitions
 2012
 "La idea de América Latina" (The idea of Latin America), Andalusian Centre of Contemporary Art of Seville, Seville, Spain.
 "Perder la forma humana. Una imagen sísmica de los años 80 latinoamericanos" (To lose the human form. A seismic image of the years 80 of Latin America), Museo Nacional Centro de Arte Reina Sofía, Madrid, Spain.
 2010
 29th São Paulo Art Biennial, “There is always to cup of sea to sail in”, São Paulo, Brazil.
 Multiple Landscape: Latin America in the MUSAC Collection, MUSAC (Museum of Contemporary Art of Castile and Leon), Spain.
 Cosmopolitan Routes: Houston Collects Latin American Art, MFAH, Sicardi Gallery, Houston Texas
 "A cidade do homem nu", São Paulo Museum of Modern Art, Sao Paulo, Brazil
 "Al calor del pensamiento" (To the heat of thought), Daros Collection at Bank Santander Foundation, Boadilla del Monte, Madrid, Spain.
 2008
 Opening – Colombia, Station Museum, Houston Texas
 2005
 "Fotográfica Bogotá" (Fotographic Bogota), Bogota, Colombia.
 2004
 "Cantos Cuentos Colombianos" (Colombian Song Tales), Daros Latinamerica Collection, Zurich, Switzerland
 39 Artists National Salon, Bogota, Colombia
 2003
 Colombia 2003, Buenos Aires Museum of Modern Art, Buenos Aires, Argentina
 The American Effect, Whitney Museum of American Art, New York, New York
 2002
 VIII Biennial of Bogota, Bogotá Museum of Modern Art, Bogota, Colombia
 2001
 "Colombia Visible e Invisible" (Visible and Invisible Colombia), Fernando Pradilla Gallery, Madrid, Spain.
 1999
 "Re-Aligning Vision", Miami Art Museum, Miami, Florida
 1998
 "Re-Aligning Vision", Archer M. Huntington Art Gallery, Texas University, Austin, Texas; Museo de Bellas Artes (Caracas), Caracas, Venezuela; Museo de Arte Contemporáneo de Monterrey, Monterrey, Mexico
 1997
 "Re-Aligning Vision", Museo del Barrio, New York; Arkansas Art Center, Little Rock, Arkansas
 Premio Marco 96, Museo de Arte Contemporáneo de Monterrey, Monterrey Mexico
 1996
 Art, Political and Religion, Barbican Centre, London, United Kingdom
 "Realismo Mágico? Arte Figurativo de Los Años Noventas en Colombia" (Magic realism? Figurative Art of the 90s in Colombia), Galerie Théoremes, Brussels, Belgium;  Melina Mercury Cultural Center, Athens, Greece; University of Essex & Aberysmith, United Kingdom
 Latin America 96 in the Fine arts Museum, Museo Nacional de Bellas Artes (Buenos Aires), Buenos Aires, Argentina.
 V Biennial of Bogota, Bogotá Museum of Modern Art, Bogota, Colombia
 Marco Prize 95, Museo de Arte Contemporáneo de Monterrey, Monterrey, Mexico
 1995
 "Arte, Política y Religión" (Art, Politics and Religion), Mead Gallery, Warwick Art Centre, University of Warwick, Coventry, United Kingdom
 "A Propósito de Colombia" (Apropos Colombia), Kulturhaus Lateinamerika, Cologne, Germany,  Marco Prize, Museo de Arte Contemporáneo de Monterrey, Monterrey, Mexico
 1994
 V Biennial of La Habana, Museum of Fine arts, Havana, Cuba
 1993
 Latin American Artists of the Twentieth Century, MoMA, New York, New York
 1992
 Echo Art, Museu de Arte Moderna, Rio de Janeiro, Brazil
 Joan Miro Sculpture Prize, Miro Centre, Barcelona, Spain.
 Latin American artists of the 20th century, Plaza de Armas, Seville, Spain.
 Colombian Contemporary art,  Expo Seville 92, Seville, Spain
 America Latins Art Contemporain, Hotel give Arts, Foundation National give Arts, Paris, France Echo Art, Museum of Modern Art, Rio de Janeiro, Brazil
 1991
 Myth and Magic in America, The Eighty, Museum Marco, Monterrey, Mexico
 1990
 Images of Silence, The Bronx Museum of the Arts, New York; Museum of Contemporary Art, San Juan, Puerto Rico
 Bogota Art Biennial, Museum of Modern Art, Bogota
 1989
 Images of Silence, Museum of Modern Art of Latin America, Washington, D.C.
 1987
 A Body Marginal, Center for Photography, Paddington, Australia
 1986
 Cem Anus of Art em Colombia, Imperial Palace, Rio of Janiero, Brazil
 IV Biennial American of Graphic Arts, Museum The Social gathering, California
 Il Biennial of The Habana, Museum of Fine arts, Havana, Cuba
 1983
 World Print Four, Museum of Modern Art, San Francisco, California
 1982
 IV Biennial of Sydney, Sydney, Australia
 Muñoz-Astudillo-Rojas-Ramírez, Museum The Social gathering, Cali, Colombia
 1981
 Graphic arts Panamericanas, Center for Inter-American Relations, New York, New York
 IV Biennial of Art of Medellín, Palace of Exhibitions, Medellín, Colombia
 XVI Biennial of Sao Paulo, Palace of Exhibitions, Sao Paulo, Brazil
 1979
 XI Biennial International of Recorded, Tokyo, Japan.
 Il Trienal Latin American of Recorded, Arts centre and Communication, Buenos Aires, Argentina
 IV Biennial Latin America of Graphic Arts, San Juan, Puerto Rico
 I Biennial International of Painting, Municipal Museum of Modern Art, Cuenca, Ecuador
 1977
 The Plastic Colombian of This Century, House of The Americas, Havana, Cuba
 The Novisimos Colombian, Museum of Art Contemporaneo, Caracas, Venezuela
 1976
 III Biennial Latin American of Graphic Arts, San Juan, Puerto Rico

Collections 
 Museum of Modern Art (MoMA), New York, New York
 La Caixa Foundation, Barcelona Spain
 Luis Angel Arango Library of the Republic Bank, Bogota, Colombia
 Daros Latin America Collection, Zurich, Switzerland.
 Colombian National Museum, Bogota, Colombia.
 National University Museum of Art, Bogota, Colombia
 House of the Americas, Havana, Cuba
 Instituto Nacional de Bellas Artes y Literatura, Mexico DF, Mexico
 MUSAC, Museum of Contemporary Art of Castile and Leon, Spain.
 Museo de Bellas Artes (Caracas), Caracas, Venezuela.
 Museum of American Art of Managua, Managua, Nicaragua.
 Museum of Contemporary Art, Vigo, Monterrey, Mexico
 Bogotá Museum of Modern Art, Bogota, Colombia
 La Tertulia Museum, Cali, Colombia
 Museum of Modern Art, Bucaramanga, Colombia
 "Colección de la Rectoria de la Universidad Nacional de Colombia" , Bogota, Colombia
 Collection Embassy of Colombia in Spain, Madrid, Spain.
 Museum of Modern Art, Barranquilla, Colombia
 Embassy of France, Bogota, Colombia
 Museum of Modern Art, Cartagena, Colombia

References

External links 
 Art Nexus
 Sicardi Gallery
 Galería Casas Riegner

Colombian artists
People from Bogotá
1946 births
Living people